Lawrence Sawyer or Larry Sawyer may refer to:

 Lawrence Sawyer, Baron Sawyer, British politician
Lawrence Sawyer (auditor), Internal audit#History of internal auditing
Larry Sawyer, One Tree Hill character